Oliver Igel (born 9 April 1978) is a German politician for the SPD and since 2011 'Bezirksbürgermeister' (district mayor) of the Berlin borough of Treptow-Köpenick.

Life and politics

Igel was born 1978 in the eastern part of Berlin and studied politics and similar stuff at the Free University of Berlin.

Igel (german word for "hedgehog") entered the left-wing SPD in 1998 and became the youngest Bezirksbürgermeister of Berlin in 2011, in the borough of Treptow-Köpenick.

References 

Living people
1978 births
21st-century German politicians
People from Berlin
Social Democratic Party of Germany politicians